The Hamiltonian is a function used to solve a problem of optimal control for a dynamical system. It can be understood as an instantaneous increment of the Lagrangian expression of the problem that is to be optimized over a certain time period. Inspired by, but distinct from, the Hamiltonian of classical mechanics, the Hamiltonian of optimal control theory was developed by Lev Pontryagin as part of his maximum principle. Pontryagin proved that a necessary condition for solving the optimal control problem is that the control should be chosen so as to optimize the Hamiltonian.

Problem statement and definition of the Hamiltonian 
Consider a dynamical system of  first-order differential equations

where  denotes a vector of state variables, and  a vector of control variables. Once initial conditions  and controls  are specified, a solution to the differential equations, called a trajectory , can be found. The problem of optimal control is to choose  (from some set  ) so that  maximizes or minimizes a certain objective function between an initial time  and a terminal time  (where  may be infinity). Specifically, the goal is to optimize a performance index  at each point in time,

subject to the above equations of motion of the state variables. The solution method involves defining an ancillary function known as the control Hamiltonian

which combines the objective function and the state equations much like a Lagrangian in a static optimization problem, only that the  multipliers , referred to as costate variables, are functions of time rather than constants.

The goal is to find an optimal control policy function  and, with it, an optimal trajectory of the state variable , which by Pontryagin's maximum principle are the arguments that maximize the Hamiltonian,
 for all 
The first-order necessary conditions for a maximum are given by

 which is the maximum principle,
 which generates the state transition function ,
 which generates 

the latter of which are referred to as the costate equations.

A sufficient condition for a maximum is the concavity of the Hamiltonian evaluated at the solution, i.e.

Derivation from the Lagrangian 
A constrained optimization problem as the one stated above usually suggests a Lagrangian expression, specifically 

where  compares to the Lagrange multiplier in a static optimization problem but is now, as noted above, a function of time. In order to eliminate , the last term on the right-hand side can be rewritten using integration by parts, such that

which can be substituted back into the Lagrangian expression to give

To derive the first-order conditions for an optimum, assume that the solution has been found and the Lagrangian is maximized. Specifically, the total derivative of  obeys

For this expression to equal zero necessitates the following optimality conditions:

If both the initial value  and terminal value  are fixed, i.e. If the terminal value is free, as is often the case, the additional condition  is necessary for optimality. The latter is called a transversality condition for a fixed horizon problem.

It can be seen that the necessary conditions are identical to the ones stated above for the Hamiltonian. Thus the Hamiltonian can be understood as a device to generate the first-order necessary conditions.

The Hamiltonian in discrete time 

When the problem is formulated in discrete time, the Hamiltonian is defined as:

and the costate equations are

(Note that the discrete time Hamiltonian at time  involves the costate variable at time   This small detail is essential so that when we differentiate with respect to  we get a term involving  on the right hand side of the costate equations. Using a wrong convention here can lead to incorrect results, i.e. a costate equation which is not a backwards difference equation).

Behavior of the Hamiltonian over time 
From Pontryagin's maximum principle, special conditions for the Hamiltonian can be derived. When the final time  is fixed and the Hamiltonian does not depend explicitly on time , then:

or if the terminal time is free, then:

Further, if the terminal time tends to infinity, a transversality condition on the Hamiltonian applies.

The Hamiltonian of control compared to the Hamiltonian of mechanics 

William Rowan Hamilton defined the Hamiltonian for describing the mechanics of a system. It is a function of three variables:

 is the so-called "conjugate momentum", defined by

Hamilton then formulated his equations to describe the dynamics of the system as

The Hamiltonian of control theory describes not the dynamics of a system but conditions for extremizing some scalar function thereof (the Lagrangian) with respect to a control variable . As normally defined, it is a function of 4 variables

The associated conditions for a maximum are

This definition agrees with that given by the article by Sussmann and Willems. (see p. 39, equation 14). Sussmann and Willems show how the control Hamiltonian can be used in dynamics e.g. for the brachistochrone problem, but do not mention the prior work of Carathéodory on this approach.

Current value and present value Hamiltonian 
In economics, the objective function in dynamic optimization problems often depends directly on time only through exponential discounting, such that it takes the form

where  is referred to as the instantaneous utility function, or felicity function. This allows a redefinition of the Hamiltonian as  where

which is referred to as the current value Hamiltonian, in contrast to the present value Hamiltonian  defined in the first section.
,

which follows immediately from the product rule. Economically,  represent current-valued shadow prices for the capital goods .

Example: Ramsey–Cass–Koopmans model 
In economics, the Ramsey–Cass–Koopmans model is used to determine an optimal savings behavior for an economy. The objective function  is the social welfare function,

to be maximized by choice of an optimal consumption path . The function  indicates the utility the representative agent of consuming  at any given point in time. The factor  represents discounting. The maximization problem is subject to the following differential equation for capital intensity, describing the time evolution of capital per effective worker:

The Hamiltonian becomes

The optimality conditions are

in addition to the transversality condition . If we let , then log-differentiating the first optimality condition with respect to  yields

Inserting this equation into the second optimality condition yields

which is known as the Keynes–Ramsey rule, which gives a condition for consumption in every period which, if followed, ensures maximum lifetime utility.

References

Further reading 
 
 
 

Optimal control